Ganti ng Puso is a 1996 Philippine action drama film directed by Francis "Jun" Posadas. The film stars Stella Ruiz and Gandong Cervantes. It also marks the film debut of Lara Morena.

The film is streaming online on YouTube.

Cast
 Stella Ruiz as Loida
 Gandong Cervantes as Jim
 Dennis Roldan as Col. Maramba
 Efren Reyes Jr. as Nick
 King Gutierrez as Dolfo
 Carol Dauden
 Johnny Vicar
 Cloyd Robinson
 Edwin Reyes
 Lara Morena as Cherry

Awards

References

External links

Full Movie on Solar Pictures

1996 films
1996 action films
Filipino-language films
Philippine action films
Philippine drama films
Moviestars Production films
Films directed by Francis Posadas